Teddy Bear, Duke & Psycho is the fifth studio album by English synth-pop band Heaven 17, released in September 1988 by Virgin Records, the band's last studio album for the label.

The album was not a commercial success and failed to enter the UK Albums Chart. The lead single "The Ballad of Go Go Brown" peaked at number 91 in the UK Singles Chart and the second, "Train of Love in Motion", failed to chart.

Production
Speaking to International Musician and Recording World magazine in 1988, Ware said of Teddy Bear, Duke & Psycho: "This is the album that should have been made between Penthouse and Pavement and The Luxury Gap. A lot of the lyrical content is similar to side two of Penthouse." Comparing the album's greater use of synthesisers and sampling than the more organic Pleasure One (1986), Ware commented: "We decided that our strength lay in synthetic manipulation. We've actually absorbed the potential of sampling technology more than most bands. We're using it as a replacement and enhancement for real instruments, rather than as a little gimmick that's thrown in." The album's cover art is reminiscent of promotional material for the 1969 New York-based film Midnight Cowboy.

Critical reception

Upon release, Music & Media commented: "After the lacklustre performance of their previous LP, Heaven 17 seem to have recovered some of the joie de vie that made them so popular. The material now is more organic, lots of funky guitars and more than the occasional flash of 60s Motown in the sound and arrangements." Julian Baggini of the Reading Evening Post wrote: "Heaven 17's new album doesn't exactly break new ground, but tracks like "Big Square People" and "Responsibility" have the potential to attract big sales, simply by being fine examples of their type. For fans of Heaven 17, it will suffice that the band are continuing to do what they do well." Robin Denselow of The Guardian commented: "For those who want well-crafted British pop that's quirky and throw-away, there's Heaven 17. [The album is] a professional, sturdy collection of songs that mix funk and white soul with slick production work and the deep relaxed and very English vocals of Glenn Gregory."

The Journal stated: "I tried to like this. A chorus in one of the songs goes, "You got to sound like you mean it", and frankly the Sheffield lads don't, and sound like they want to take the money and run." Victoria Thieberger of Australian newspaper The Age wrote: "This album confirms a long, slow slide for Heaven 17. Since their pioneering synthpop on Penthouse and Pavement, the band has descended into the banal. Most of this album is irritatingly repetitive: doubtful lyrics chanted to an overbearing disco beat." Thieberger highlighted "The Ballad of Go-Go Brown" and "Don't Stop for No One" as the two standout tracks.

Dale Winnitowy of the Canadian Surrey Leader commented: "Full bodied production ties together glamorous soul and plenty of funky rumble-tumble rhythms. A strong album from Heaven 17, who I had thought were out for the count." In a retrospective review, Aaron Badgley of AllMusic considered the album to be "somewhat disappointing" compared to the band's previous two albums, adding: "This release saw Heaven 17 attempting to mix pop with R&B. But with all of the highlights, the CD just does not hold together well. The songs are overlong and the production is so slick that the melodies get lost in the mix."

Track listing

Personnel
Heaven 17
 Glenn Gregory – lead vocals, backing vocals 
 Martyn Ware – keyboards, synthesizers, programming, backing vocals 
 Ian Craig Marsh – keyboards, synthesizers, programming

Additional musicians
 Nick Plytas – acoustic piano 
 Tim Cansfield – guitars, arrangements
 Randy Hope-Taylor – bass guitar 
 Gerry Conway – drums, percussion 
 Pandit Dinesh – percussion 
 Frank Mead – saxophones, harmonica
 Richard Niles – string arrangements
 Carol Kenyon – backing vocals

Other personnel
 Heaven 17 – producers, arrangements 
 Graham Bonnet – engineer 
 Phil Legg – engineer 
 Jean Pierre Masclet – photography
 Assorted Images – sleeve design

Charts

References

External links
 

1988 albums
Heaven 17 albums
Virgin Records albums